20th Lancers may refer to:
 20th Lancers (British Indian Army), a regiment of the British Indian Army which saw service from 1921 to 1937 which later became the Indian Armoured Corps Training Centre and was allotted to India  in 1947
 20 Lancers (India), the successor regiment re-raised by the Indian Army in 1956
 20th Lancers (Pakistan), a regiment re-raised by the Pakistan Army in 1956